Jack Krizmanich (born December 16, 1978) is an American actor and model.  He played Aaron Spencer on the MyNetworkTV serial Wicked Wicked Games.  His previous acting credits include Passions, What I Like About You, Ludis on True Blood and the film Shadowboxer.

Krizmanich was born in the small town of Phoenixville, Pennsylvania, just outside Philadelphia. While working at a restaurant in high school, Jack was discovered by an agent at IMAGE Models.

Filmography

Film

Television

References

External links
 

1978 births
Living people
American male television actors
Male actors from Pennsylvania